Mika Mäki (born February 27, 1988) is a Finnish former racing driver.

Career 

Mika started in karting, and competed for five years before heading to Germany and its Formula BMW ADAC series in 2005, finishing fourth in the Rookie Cup, and took his first victory at the Norisring. He moved to the Eifelland Racing Team for the 2006 season, finishing as runner-up with nine podiums.

In 2007 Mäki got a seat in the Red Bull Junior Team. He was one of eighteen drivers selected for the programme of developing young talented drivers towards Formula One. During the season he won five rounds and gained the title of Italian Formula Renault Champion.

For the 2008 season Mika signed with Mücke Motorsport to compete in the F3 Euroseries. He opened the season with a victory in Hockenheimring. He finished the season 5th in the results with two wins and 5 podiums.

On June 15, Mika had a serious accident at the city of Tampere, driving a Nissan 350Z. Reports quoted local police as suggesting that Mäki may have been involved in a street race.

Mäki also made his GP2 Series début in 2008 by competing in the first round of the 2008–09 GP2 Asia Series season for the Arden team. However, he was then replaced by Renger van der Zande.

Mäki returned to the F3 Euroseries for the 2009 season, having signed a deal with the Signature-Plus team. Mäki finished on the podium four times, including a win at Brands Hatch, and finished sixth in the championship.

Racing record

Career summary

References

External links 
 Official website
 Mika Mäki career statistics at Driver Database

Finnish racing drivers
1988 births
Living people
People from Pirkkala
Formula 3 Euro Series drivers
Formula Renault 2.0 NEC drivers
Italian Formula Renault 2.0 drivers
Formula Renault Eurocup drivers
Formula BMW ADAC drivers
GP2 Asia Series drivers
Arden International drivers
Sportspeople from Pirkanmaa
Eifelland Racing drivers
Epsilon Euskadi drivers
Mücke Motorsport drivers
Signature Team drivers
Hitech Grand Prix drivers
Motopark Academy drivers
Karting World Championship drivers
Koiranen GP drivers